Charles Romeyn Dake (December 22, 1849 – April 23, 1899) was a 19th-century American homeopathic physician and writer. As an author, his name is sometimes spelled Charles Romyn Dake.

Biography
Charles Dake was born in Pittsburgh, Pennsylvania to David Merit Dake and Mary Manule. His father and an uncle, J. P. Dake of Nashville, Tennessee, were also homeopaths. He had two daughters and at least one grandchild, Grace Bechtold.

He was an 1873 graduate of the Columbia University College of Physicians and Surgeons, and he practiced in Belleville, Illinois. In 1893 he became editor of the journal Homeopathic News.

Dake published two short stories and one novel, A Strange Discovery, which is a sequel to Edgar Allan Poe's The Narrative of Arthur Gordon Pym of Nantucket.

In early 1899 he discovered that he had lung cancer and committed suicide by shooting himself.

Works
  (translations also published in Germany and France)

References

External links

 
 

19th-century American novelists
Physicians from Illinois
Columbia University Vagelos College of Physicians and Surgeons alumni
American homeopaths
1849 births
1899 deaths
Suicides by firearm in Illinois
American male novelists
19th-century American male writers
1890s suicides